Wilhelm "Willi" Heidel (28 February 1916 – 20 September 2008) was a Romanian field handball player of German ethnicity who competed in the 1936 Summer Olympics.

A Transylvanian Saxon born in Hermannstadt (Sibiu), at the time part of Austria-Hungary. He died in Lohhof, Germany.

Heidel was part of the Romanian field handball team, which finished fifth in the Olympic tournament. He played all three matches.

External links
Johann Steiner, "Geschichten rund um den Handball in Siebenbürgen" (IX), in Siebenbürgische Zeitung, February 2002 
Johann Steiner, "Deutsche Weltmeister unter rumänischer Fahne", in Siebenbürgische Zeitung, February 2007 
Willi Heidel's profile at Sports Reference.com

1916 births
2008 deaths
Sportspeople from Sibiu
Transylvanian Saxon people
Romanian people of German descent
Romanian male handball players
Olympic handball players of Romania
Field handball players at the 1936 Summer Olympics
Romanian emigrants to Germany